Tegteza is a monotypic moth genus of the family Erebidae. Its only species, Tegteza palpalis, is found in Colombia. Both the genus and species were first described by Francis Walker in 1869.

References

Calpinae
Monotypic moth genera